Holos may refer to:

 Holos (software), data management software
 Holos (political party), a Ukrainian political party

People with the surname
 Jonas Holøs, a Norwegian hockey player
 Odd Steinar Holøs, a Norwegian politician

See also
 
 
 Holo (disambiguation)